Mohammad Helmi bin Haji Zambin is a Bruneian professional footballer who plays as a right-sided full-back or midfielder for DPMM FC and the Brunei national team.

Club career
Helmi began his career with Indera SC of the Brunei Premier League. He moved to AH United for the 2007-08 season, and the following year was selected to play for Brunei's sole professional club, DPMM FC. He went back to Indera SC on loan for the two seasons the FIFA ban on Brunei was in effect.

After the appointment of Steve Kean, Helmi only made 5 appearances in the 2014 S.League. Kean converted him to a right-sided full-back in the following season to help him gain more playing time. He made 15 appearances as DPMM won their first S.League title.

With Rene Weber at the helm, Helmi established himself as the first-choice right-back for the club in the 2018 season. He scored his first league goal in five years slotting a rebound against Geylang International in a 2–6 victory on 10 June. With DPMM dominating the competition wherever they play, Helmi won the 2019 Singapore Premier League as well as the 2022 Brunei FA Cup playing for the royalty-owned club.

International career 

Helmi was with the Brunei under-21s that competed in the 2007 Hassanal Bolkiah Trophy. He made his full international debut for the Wasps in a 0–1 loss against the Philippines on 13 May 2008 for the 2008 AFC Challenge Cup qualification. He scored his first international goal against Cambodia in the group stage of the 2012 AFF Suzuki Cup qualification.

Helmi was a late addition to the Brunei national team squad for the 2016 AFC Solidarity Cup held in Kuching, Malaysia. He started the first match at right-back in a 4–0 win over Timor-Leste. He kept his place for the rest of the tournament, playing four games.

Helmi's consistent club form led to an international callup for the 2018 AFF Suzuki Cup qualification matches against Timor-Leste in early September. He started the first leg in Kuala Lumpur which was a 3–1 defeat to the Wasps. He kept his place at right-back seven days later in a 1–0 victory for Brunei, unfortunately the score was not enough for the Wasps to qualify for the Suzuki Cup tournament proper.

Helmi accepted another callup in June 2019 for the two-legged 2022 World Cup qualification matches against Mongolia, despite several of his teammates pulling out at late notice. He played at right-back for both matches, which resulted in a 2-3 aggregate loss and early elimination for Brunei.

International goals

Honours

Team
Indera SC
Brunei Super League: 2012–13

DPMM FC
 S.League: 2014 Runner-Up, 2015
 Singapore Premier League: 2019
 Singapore League Cup (3): 2009, 2012, 2014
 Brunei FA Cup: 2022

References

External links

Living people
1987 births
Association football midfielders
Bruneian footballers
Brunei international footballers
DPMM FC players
Indera SC players